Dundee City West (Gaelic: Baile Dhùn Dè an Iar) is a constituency of the Scottish Parliament (Holyrood) covering part of the council area of Dundee City. It elects one Member of the Scottish Parliament (MSP) by the first past the post method of election. It is one of ten constituencies in the North East Scotland electoral region, which elects seven additional members, in addition to the ten constituency MSPs, to produce a form of proportional representation for the region as a whole.

The constituency was created for the 2011 Scottish Parliament election, and largely replaced the previous seat of Dundee West. Since creation it has been held by Joe FitzPatrick of the Scottish National Party; FitzPatrick had previously served as the member for Dundee West since the 2007 Scottish Parliament election.

Electoral region

The other nine constituencies of the North East Scotland region are Aberdeen Central, Aberdeen Donside, Aberdeen South and North Kincardine, Aberdeenshire East, Aberdeenshire West, Angus North and Mearns, Angus South, Banffshire and Buchan Coast and Dundee City East.

The region covers all of the Aberdeen City council area, the Aberdeenshire council area, the Angus council area, the Dundee City council area and part of the Moray council area.

Constituency boundaries and council area 

Dundee City is represented by two constituencies in the Scottish Parliament: Dundee City East and Dundee City West.

A Dundee West constituency was created at the same time as the Scottish Parliament, in 1999, with the name and boundaries of an  existing Westminster constituency. In 2005, the boundaries of the Westminster (House of Commons) constituency were subject to some alteration, and now no longer correspond to Holyrood constituencies. The current Holyrood boundaries were introduced for the 2011 Scottish Parliament election with the former Dundee West constituency being renamed and redrawn slightly to now include the 'Hebrides' neighbourhood at Claverhouse just west of the A90 road, and the edge-of-town housing developments at Dykes of Gray and the former Liff Hospital. The constituency consists of the following electoral wards:

In full: Strathmartine, Lochee, West End
In part: Coldside, Maryfield, North East (shared with Dundee City East)

Member of the Scottish Parliament

Election results

2020s

2010s

See also
 Politics of Dundee

References

External links

Constituencies of the Scottish Parliament
Politics of Dundee
2011 establishments in Scotland
Constituencies established in 2011
Scottish Parliament constituencies and regions from 2011
Broughty Ferry